The 2017 FIBA Stanković Continental Champions' Cup, or 2017 FIBA Mini World Cup, officially called Dongfeng Yueda KIA FIBA Stanković Continental Champions' Cup 2017, was the 15th annual FIBA Stanković Continental Champions' Cup tournament. It was held in Shenzhen, from July 19 to July 23, 2017.

Participating teams

Round-robin results

Team standings

Day 1

Day 2

Day 3

Final round

Third-place playoff

Final

Final standings

References

External links 
  

2017
2016–17 in Chinese basketball
2016–17 in Egyptian basketball
2016–17 in German basketball
2016–17 in Croatian basketball